The vice president of Angola is the second highest political position in Angola; it is appointed by and is the deputy to the president. The position was established by the constitution of 2010.

Vice presidents of Angola (2010–present)

References

See also

Angola
President of Angola
List of presidents of Angola
Prime Minister of Angola
List of prime ministers of Angola
List of colonial governors of Angola
List of heads of state of Democratic People's Republic of Angola
List of heads of government of Democratic People's Republic of Angola
Lists of incumbents
List of national leaders

Politics of Angola
 
Angola
2010 establishments in Angola